Shark Tank is an American business reality television series that premiered on August 9, 2009, on ABC. The show is the American franchise of the international format Dragons' Den, which originated in Japan as Money Tigers in 2001. It shows entrepreneurs making business presentations to a panel of five investors or "sharks", who decide whether to invest in their companies.

The series has been a ratings success in its time slot, winning the Primetime Emmy Award for Outstanding Structured Reality Program four times (2014–2017) in the first four years of that category's existence. In 2012–13, it won Outstanding Reality Program.

Premise 
The show features a panel of investors called "sharks," who decide whether to invest as entrepreneurs make business presentations on their company or product. The sharks often find weaknesses and faults in an entrepreneur's product, business model or valuation of their company. Some of the investors are usually kindhearted and try to soften the impact of rejection, like panel member Barbara Corcoran, while others such as Kevin O'Leary can be "brutal" and show "no patience even for tales of hardship". The sharks are paid as cast stars of the show, but the money they invest is their own. The entrepreneur can make a handshake deal (gentleman's agreement) on the show if a panel member is interested. However, if all of the panel members opt out, the entrepreneur leaves empty-handed.

The show is said to portray "the drama of pitch meetings and the interaction between the entrepreneurs and tycoons". A pitch of around 45 minutes by a contestant is edited to about 11 minutes. As of 2018, approximately 35,000 to 40,000 entrepreneurs apply each season, with about 1,000 advancing to the next step, 150 getting to pitch the sharks, and less than 100 making it on the air; most episodes contain four pitches per broadcast hour.

Post-show 
Shark cast member Kevin O'Leary believes about 20% of the handshake deals made on the show are never executed due to the investors' due diligence process following the handshake deal, which includes product testing and examining the contestants' business and personal financials. Fellow shark Robert Herjavec believes that about 90% of those withdrawals come from the entrepreneur, in some cases due to only appearing on the program for publicity.

The show is often responsible for what has become known as the Shark Tank effect. Simply appearing on the show, even without getting an offer, has the potential to significantly boost sales for companies. Some entrepreneurs have reported 10- to 20-fold increases in daily revenues after the show's airing.

Cast

Sharks 
Two of the show's longstanding sharks, Robert Herjavec and Kevin O'Leary, are Canadian entrepreneurs who had previously appeared on the Canadian version of Dragons' Den.

Notable companies 

Some notable companies that have appeared on Shark Tank include:

Bombas
Breathometer
Coffee Meets Bagel
Doorbot, now known as Ring (acquired by Amazon) – first entrepreneur to appear as a (Guest) Shark
Kodiak Cakes (did not reach a deal)
Scan (acquired by Snapchat)
Scrub Daddy
Groove Book (acquired by Shutterfly)
Talbott Teas (acquired by Jamba Juice)
Manscaped
Plated (acquired by Albertsons)
Moki DoorStep

Due to show popularity, companies have falsely advertised that they've appeared on Shark Tank when the air rate is 0.22% (88 aired of 40,000 applicants for 2018 season). A full list of companies that actually appeared on Shark Tank can be found on ABC's website, with cult following websites such as  AllSharkTankProducts.com,  SharkTankContestant.com,  Sharkalytics.com, and  SharkTankTales.com documenting details and products for all companies, and Gazette Review documenting episode recaps and updates on what happened "after Shark Tank".

Episodes

Timeline

Early seasons (2009–2013) 

Shark Tank premiered in August 2009 and aired 14 episodes through January 2010. In August, it was renewed for a second season.

Season 2 premiered with a "sneak peek" episode on Sunday, March 20, 2011, before resuming its regular Friday night time slot on March 25, 2011. Season 2 had 9 episodes, 5 of them featuring new panel members. Comedian Jeff Foxworthy and Mark Cuban replaced panel member Kevin Harrington in those episodes. In season 2, Kevin O'Leary, Barbara Corcoran, Daymond John, and Robert Herjavec appeared in all nine episodes; Harrington appeared in four, Cuban in three, and Foxworthy in two.

Shark Tank third season premiered in January 2012. From the third season, Kevin Harrington was replaced by Mark Cuban, while the "queen of QVC" Lori Greiner replaced Barbara Corcoran on 4 episodes. Kevin O'Leary, Daymond John, Robert Herjavec, and Mark Cuban appeared in all 15 episodes of season three. In February, ABC ordered two additional episodes for season 3 using unaired footage, which brought the season's episode total to 15.

On May 10, 2012, Shark Tank was renewed for a fourth season consisting of 26 episodes. This is the first time the series received a full season order. Filming began on June 30, 2012. According to TV Guide, as of December 2012, the show's panel members had invested $12.4 million in the business opportunities presented to them during that season.

In 2013, ABC renewed the show for a fifth season. Season 5 premiered on September 20, 2013. In October 2013, ABC ordered an additional two episodes for the season. In December 2013, ABC ordered another four episodes, bringing the season order to 29 episodes. Steve Tisch and John Paul DeJoria were added as panel members.

CNBC syndication (2013–2015) 

In 2013, CNBC licensed exclusive off-network cable rights for the series from ABC. In May 2014, ABC announced a sixth season starting in September 2014. The series began its syndication run on CNBC on December 30, 2013.

The seventh season of the show premiered on September 25, 2015. Actor/investor Ashton Kutcher, music manager/CEO Troy Carter, and venture investor Chris Sacca all appeared as guest sharks.

New set (2017–present) 

The ninth season of the show premiered on October 1, 2017, with guest shark Richard Branson. and a new, modern-looking set, Eames Lounge Chairs, penthouse views of a city, infinity pool, glass staircase to an upstairs lounge, and more space.

The tenth season of Shark Tank subtitled "Decade of Dreams" premiered on October 7, 2018. The first episode of the 10th season marked the show's landmark 200th episode.

On February 5, 2019, ABC announced at the TCA press tour that Shark Tank will return for an eleventh season, which premiered on September 29, 2019.

On May 21, 2020, ABC renewed the series for a twelfth season, which premiered on October 16, 2020.

On May 13, 2021, ABC renewed the series for a thirteenth season, which premiered on October 8, 2021.

On May 13, 2022, ABC renewed the series for a fourteenth season, which premiered on September 23, 2022, with a first ever live episode, and featured actress and Goop founder Gwyneth Paltrow as a guest shark.

Production
Shark Tank is produced by Mark Burnett and based on the format Dragons' Den, which originated in 2001 with the Japanese show, Tigers of Money. Shark Tank, however, more closely resembles the format of the British version of Dragons' Den, which premiered in 2005.

The show initially required each contestant to sign an agreement with Finnmax, the producer of Shark Tank, promising Finnmax the option of taking a "2% royalty" or "5% equity stake" in the contestant's business venture. However, in October 2013, this requirement was repealed by the network, retroactively, due to pressure from panel member Mark Cuban. Cuban felt the requirement would lower the quality of the entrepreneurs, as savvy investors would be wary of trading away a portion of their company just for appearing on the show. A number of potential entrepreneurs had declined to participate in the show for this reason.

COVID-19 precautions
During the 12th season, the show was moved to Las Vegas, Nevada. Due to the COVID-19 pandemic, the 12th season was produced in a quarantine bubble (which applied to the production staff but not the sharks or entrepreneurs themselves), the set was partially rearranged so the sharks' chairs were at least six feet away from each other, and the sharks would not come up to the entrepreneurs to shake their hands when a deal was made (a wave or "long-distance fist bump" was used instead). In future seasons, the handshakes returned but the chairs have remained separated.

Spin-offs and specials

In 2015, ABC launched a companion series, Beyond the Tank, which shows the current state of companies that appeared on Shark Tank, including both those that made a deal and those that were rejected by investors. Two seasons of Beyond the Tank have aired so far, one in 2015 and one in 2016.

A prime time special titled Shark Tank: Greatest of All Time premiered on February 26, 2020.

Reception

Critical reception
During its first season, Shark Tank saw a mostly positive reception. Josh Wolk of Entertainment Weekly wrote, "The moneymen ask informed questions and make shrewd decisions, a welcome relief from Donald Trump's capricious calls on Burnett's Celebrity Apprentice". Heather Havrilesky from Salon said that "ABC's Shark Tank is easily the best new reality TV show to air this summer." Tom Shales of The Washington Post wrote, "It sounds gimmicky and visually tedious, with most of the so-called action taking place in a conference room. It's all those things, but the moments of misery make it memorable." Shales noted that the series was premiering during an economic recession, and that many of the aspiring entrepreneurs had poured significant amounts of money into their businesses; he praised "how deftly the show personalizes the desperation and pain experienced by victims of a broken down economy." And David Hinckley of the New York Daily News said, "Once you get past its somewhat misleading title, Mark Burnett's new Shark Tank is a well-paced hour that offers entertainment without humiliation."

Ratings
During the first two seasons, the series barely peaked at 5 million viewers, with season 2 only having 9 episodes in its run. By season 3, the show's viewership went past 5 million and started to crack the top 100 in the ratings. By 2012, the show averaged over 6 million viewers per episode. It is the most watched program on Friday nights in the 18- to 49-year-old demographic.  As a result, ABC added three more episodes to the original season order of 22. In its sixth season, the series reached over 9 million per episode, becoming its most successful season to date.

Awards and nominations

In popular culture

Jimmy Kimmel has pitched twice on Shark Tank (horse pants and a wearable cone for kids) as a comedy skit which aired on his show, Jimmy Kimmel Live!.
Bill Nye has pitched the Global Citizen Festival on Shark Tank.
Disney's Phineas and Ferb character, Dr. Heinz Doofenshmirtz, pitched his invention on the 2013 season finale in a cross-over episode.
On the Season 6 Episode "The Tank" of Grace and Frankie, Grace and Frankie pitch their Rise Up toilet invention to the Sharks.
Saturday Night Live has parodied Shark Tank twice: once with Chris Rock and once with Kevin Hart, both as investors pitching a parodied ISIS and a Lamp Wearing Sunglasses, respectively.

See also
 List of Shark Tank investments
 American Inventor
 The Big Idea
 Fortune: Million Pound Giveaway
 Win in China
 The Profit
 Redemption Inc.
 West Texas Investors Club
 Dragons' Den

References

External links
 
 

2000s American reality television series
2009 American television series debuts
2010s American reality television series
2020s American reality television series
American Broadcasting Company original programming
American television series based on Japanese television series
Business-related television series
English-language television shows
Franchised television formats
Primetime Emmy Award for Outstanding Reality Program winners
 
Television series by MGM Television
Television series by Sony Pictures Television
Television shows featuring audio description